Palazzo Gondi is a palace in Florence, Italy, located a block from Piazza della Signoria.
It was built in 1490 under design by Giuliano da Sangallo, who was inspired by other major works of stately buildings in the city, such as Palazzo Medici and Palazzo Strozzi. Among the elements borrowed from these earlier works are the cube-shape set around a central courtyard, the ashlar sloping on each of three floors, and the arched windows.

Compared to his models, however, Sangallo was able to modify the use of these elements, making it one of the most successful Florentine buildings of its time. The most innovative element is in the design of the windows: the profile of stones arranged in a radial pattern, which resemble the facets of a precious stone. The windows on the second floor were designed slightly wider than the others to compensate for the optical foreshortening.

The construction dragged on, and the building remained incomplete for several centuries. At the end of the 17th century Antonio Maria Ferri worked on the architecture and Matteo Bonechi  on the paintings. The building was flanked by an old family house belonging to the Asini family, demolished around 1870 to widen the road along Palazzo Vecchio. On that occasion the building was also expanded with the creation of the third door (the left) and the construction of a new "slice" of the building that increased the number of windows on the facade, creating a similar perspective on Via de' Gondi. Accommodation on the south side had been designed by Giuseppe Poggi, the architect of Piazzale Michelangelo, but was demolished in 1874. Leonardo da Vinci had lived in one of the destroyed houses and is said to have painted the Mona Lisa there. Today the building still belongs to descendants of the family, but on the ground floor are a bar and other businesses.

In the central courtyard, a portico with Corinthian columns on four sides, there is a 17th-century fountain, which uses water from the Boboli Gardens which also supplies the Fontana del Nettuno. From here begins the monumental staircase to the upper floors. The porch is a statue of Roman Togata.

Among the decorations inside the palace, there is a fresco and some paintings by Italian and French artists. On the first floor there is also a monumental fireplace which was designed by Sangallo.

Bibliography

Andreas Tönnesmann, Der Palazzo Gondi in Florenz, Römische Studien der Bibliotheca Hertziana, Werner'sche Verlagsgesellschaft, Worms 1983
Sandra Carlini, Lara Mercanti, Giovanni Straffi, I Palazzi parte prima. Arte e storia degli edifici civili di Firenze, Alinea, Florence, 2001.
Mariella Zoppi e Cristina Donati, Guida ai chiostri e cortili di Firenze, bilingue, Alinea Editrice, Florence, 1997.
Marcello Vannucci, Splendidi palazzi di Firenze, Le Lettere, Florence, 1995.

Buildings and structures completed in 1490
Houses completed in the 15th century
Gondi
Renaissance architecture in Florence